The 2013 Women's Oceania Cup was the eighth edition of the women's field hockey tournament. It was held from 30 October to 3 November in Stratford.

The tournament served as a qualifier for the 2014 FIH World Cup.

Australia won the tournament for the fifth time, defeating New Zealand 5–4 in penalties after the final finished in a 2–2 draw. Samoa finished in third place, defeating Papua New Guinea 4–3 in penalties following a 0–0 draw.

Teams

Results
All times are local (NZDT).

Preliminary round

Pool

Fixtures

Classification

Third and fourth place

Final

Statistics

Final standings

Goalscorers

References

Women's Oceania Cup
Oceania Cup
Oceania Cup
International women's field hockey competitions hosted by New Zealand
Oceania Cup
Oceania Cup
Sport in Stratford, New Zealand
Oceania Cup